Sigmoid colon volvulus, also known as sigmoid volvulus, is volvulus affecting the sigmoid colon. It is a common cause of bowel obstruction and constipation. It is common in Asia, India (7% of intestinal obstruction) and especially South India because of the high fibre diet. It is a very common cause of large bowel obstruction in Peru and Bolivia due to high altitude.

Signs and symptoms 
 Pain in abdomen – initially left-sided, eventually all over
 Absolute constipation
 Enormous distension of abdomen
 Late vomiting and eventually dehydration
 Features of peritonitis
 Hiccup and retching may occur
 Tyre-like feel of the abdomen is diagnostic

Cause
The condition is more common in males and with old age. It is also common in people with chronic constipation and laxative abuse.

It is common in:
 Ogilvie syndrome
 Individuals with learning difficulties
 Chagas disease
 Hypothyroidism
 Anticholinergic drugs
 Multiple sclerosis
 Scleroderma
 Parkinson's disease

In sigmoid, volvulus rotation is always anticlockwise. It requires one and a half rotation to cause vascular obstruction and gangrene which eventually leads to perforation either at the root or at the summit of the sigmoid loop.

Diagnosis 
 Plain X-ray (diagnostic in 70–80%): coffee bean sign is seen
 Contrast enema: bird beak sign
 CT scan: shows characteristic whirl pattern
 Blood: haematocrit, renal functions, serum electrolytes

Treatment 
 RT aspiration
 IV fluids
 Catheterisation
 Antibiotics
 By flatus tube or sigmoidoscope, derotation is done
 If derotation does not occur, then laparotomy through midline incision should be done. It is derotated manually. If viable, it can be fixed to lateral wall of abdomen or pelvis
 If sigmoid colon is gangrenous, then Hartmann's operation or Paul Mikulicz operation is done

References

External links 

Human diseases and disorders
Diseases of intestines